Pauline Lan Xinmei (born 16 November 1965) is a Taiwanese host, actress, singer and businesswoman.

Filmography

Television series

Film
Myth of City (1985)
The Funny Family (1986)
A Book of Heroes (1986)
Café. Waiting. Love (2014)
Always Miss You (2019)

Television host

Discography

References

External links
 https://web.archive.org/web/20071004121310/http://popblog.tvbs.com.tw/Blog/woman/
 
 Pauline Lan at the Hong Kong Movie Database

1965 births
Living people
20th-century Taiwanese actresses
20th-century Taiwanese women singers
21st-century Taiwanese actresses
21st-century Taiwanese women singers
Businesspeople in the food industry
People from Yunlin County
Taiwanese film actresses
Taiwanese Mandopop singers
Taiwanese television actresses
Taiwanese women in business